Killian Clarke (born 19 September 1993) is a Gaelic footballer from Shercock, County Cavan, Republic of Ireland; who plays with his club Shercock and for the Cavan county team.  He is one of a small number of latter-day Cavan players to have won Ulster football championship titles at Minor, U21 and Senior grade, as well as a Railway Cup football title with Ulster in 2016.

Playing career 
Clarke is a nephew of former Cavan GAA Football forward and past Cavan Minor Football Manager, Jodie Clarke.  He plays club football for Shercock GAA.
Killian was a promising underage track and cross country athlete with Shercock AC and Cavan as well as a prominent underage soccer player, before focussing his energies on Gaelic Football in his mid-teens.

Cavan Minors 
When he was 16, he was selected for Cavan minor trials but was not selected for the county after being told he was too slow so he joined a cross-country team at Shercock AC to improve his speed.  
He was selected to play Minor Football for Cavan in 2010 and 2011, and was part of the Cavan Minor Team that won the Ulster Minir Championship in 2011 after a 37 year gap.

Cavan U21's 
Clarke graduated from Minor in 2011 to U21 in 2012, and won a trilogy of Ulster U21 titles between 2012 and 2014

University 
Clarke attended university at the University of Ulster in Northern Ireland.  During his time there, Clarke contested two Sigerson Cup campaign - including 2016 - when UU were hosts.

Cavan Senior Football Team 
Whilst at UU, at the age of 19 he made his inter-county debut for Cavan against Donegal in the Ulster Senior Football Championship. After leaving university, he became a stockbroker in Dublin for Cantor Fitzgerald. 

In 2013, Clarke was nominated for the GAA GPA All Stars Awards, being his clubs first GPA All-Star nominee. In 2017, he was named captain of Cavan for the year. This lasted for a year before Clarke stepped down. In 2019, Clarke played in his first Ulster final, losing to Donegal. 

In 2019,  Clarke received a red card during Cavan's National Football League match against Tyrone at Healy Park. Later in the year, Clarke announced he was stepping away from county football temporarily due to wanting to focus on his personal life after having made 72 senior appearances for his county.

Killian returned to the Cavan panel for the delayed 2020 Ulster Championship campaign, where Cavan shocked Donegal in an eventful Ulster Final to bring the Anglo Celt Cup back to the Breffni county.  Cavan exited the 2020 All-Ireland Championship at the hands of Dublin in the AI Semi-Final.  Clarke was part of the Cavan team that won promotion from NFL Division 4 to Division 3 in 2022, winning the NFL Divisional Final against Tipperary in Croke Park in April 2022 in the process.

Ulster 
In 2016, Clarke was selected at Full Back by Ulster Team Manager Pete McGrath to represent Ulster in the Interprovincial Railway Cup.  Ulster defeated Munster in the Semi-Final and overcame Connacht in Pairc Sean MacDiarmada in December 2016, to win his first Railway Cup.

In 2020, Killian was part of the Cavan Senior Football team which won the Ulster Senior Football Championship and secured a second Irish News Ulster All Star Award in the process.

International rules 
In 2015 he was placed on the standby list for the Ireland's International Rules Series against Australia, however did not play.  On 25 October 2017, Clarke was named in the Ireland squad for the 2017 International Rules Series against Australia in November. Clarke played for Ireland during the series despite issues with his passport.

Honours
Ulster
 InterProvincial Football (Railway Cup): 2016 

Cavan
Ulster Senior Football Championship (1): 2020
Ulster Under-21 Football Championship (3): 2012, 2013, 2014
Ulster Minor Football Championship (1): 2011

Shercock
 Cavan Intermediate Football Championship (1): 2017
 Cavan Junior Football Championship (1): 2011

Individual
 Tailteann Cup Team of the Year (1): 2022
 Irish News Ulster All-Star (2): 2013, 2020

References

1993 births
Living people
Cavan inter-county Gaelic footballers
Stockbrokers